Xu Miao (172–249), courtesy name Jingshan, was an official of the state of Cao Wei during the Three Kingdoms period of China. He started his career in the late Eastern Han dynasty under the warlord Cao Cao, who was the de facto head of the Han central government in that period. After the end of the Han dynasty in 220, Xu Miao served under Cao Cao's son and successor, Cao Pi, who established the Cao Wei state with himself as the emperor. He lived through the reigns of three Wei emperors – Cao Pi, Cao Rui and Cao Fang – and held various high offices in the Wei government.

See also
 Lists of people of the Three Kingdoms

Notes

References

 Chen, Shou (3rd century). Records of Three Kingdoms (Sanguozhi).
 Pei, Songzhi (5th century). Annotations to Records of the Three Kingdoms (Sanguozhi zhu).

Cao Wei politicians
171 births
249 deaths
Han dynasty politicians from Beijing
Cao Wei generals
Political office-holders in Gansu
Generals from Beijing
Officials under Cao Cao